Carla D. Morrow is the former assistant coach of the Chicago Sky of the Women's National Basketball Association and former assistant coach at Xavier University. She attended the University of Tulsa, where she played college basketball.

Career 
 Missouri State University – Director of Basketball Operations
 University of Colorado –  Director of Basketball Operations
 Xavier University – Assistant Coach
 Chicago Sky – Assistant Coach

References

Year of birth missing (living people)
Living people
American women's basketball coaches
Chicago Sky coaches